Gabriela Ruffels (born 14 April 2000) is an Australian former tennis player and current professional golfer. Starting at the age of eight, Ruffels started playing tennis and won twenty one International Tennis Federation doubles events in Europe. She also was the number one ranking Australian junior when she was twelve. After switching from tennis to golf in 2015, Ruffels primarily competed in Australia from 2016 to 2017. In 2018, Ruffels joined the USC Trojans women's golf team at the University of Southern California. With USC, Ruffels appeared at the NCAA Division I Women's Golf Championships from 2018 to 2019 in both the individual and team events. 

During this time period, Ruffels became the first ever Australian to win the U.S. Women's Amateur in 2019. In professional events, Ruffels was tied for 13th at the 2020 U.S. Women's Open and the 2020 Women's British Open. At the ANA Inspiration, Ruffels was tied for fifteenth in 2020 and tied for nineteenth in 2021. During the 2021 Women's PGA Championship, Ruffels finished the event in a tie for thirty-third place. Ruffels announced her decision to turn professional on February 10, 2021. As a professional golfer that year, Ruffels primarily competed in LPGA Tour events while also appearing at the Symetra Tour and Ladies European Tour. During golf events held in 2021, Ruffels was fourth at the IOA Championship and tied for seventeenth at the Hugel-Air Premia LA Open.

Early life and education
Ruffels was born on 14 April 2000, in Orlando, Florida. Her parents are former tennis players Anna-Maria Fernandez and Ray Ruffels. During her childhood, Ruffels lived in Laguna Niguel, California before moving to Melbourne, Australia. At the age of six, Ruffels began to play tennis and continued until she was fourteen.

Her two years older brother Ryan also was a talented tennis player and became a successful golfer, representing Australia in the 2014 Eisenhower Trophy and turned professional in 2016.

For her post-secondary education, Ruffels enrolled at the University of Southern California in 2018 to study business administration.

Career

Tennis
As a tennis player, Ruffels won three doubles championships from 2011 to 2012. From 2013 to 2014, Ruffels primarily competed in ITF Grade 4 and Grade 5 events throughout Australia. In singles, her best finish was the quarterfinals at the 2014 Wilson Tennis Canterbury. For doubles, Ruffel's won the 2014 New South Wales Junior International. In other finals, Ruffels lost at the Wilson Tennis Canterbury and Auckland ITF Indoor Champs events in 2014. In team events, Ruffels was part of the Australian team that finished fourth at the 2014 World Junior Tennis Finals. Overall, Ruffels was the number one ranking Australian junior when she was twelve years old and held the number three ranking two years later. She also had twenty one doubles event wins held by the ITF in Europe.

Amateur golf
At the beginning of 2015, Ruffels became tired of tennis and switched to golf. As an amateur golfer, Ruffels primarily played in Australia from 2016 to 2017 while also competing in Singapore, the United States and Canada. During these years, she was ninth at the 2016 Australian Women's Amateur and 17th at the 2017 Australian Women's Amateur. In 2018, Ruffels joined the USC Trojans women's golf team. At the NCAA Division I Women's Golf Championships, Ruffels tied for 38th in 2018 and tied for 19th in 2019 at the individual events. In the team events, Ruffels was part of the Southern California team that made it to the semifinals in 2018 and the quarterfinals in 2019. Ruffels was also a member of the International team that won the 2019 Arnold Palmer Cup.

While competing for USC, Ruffels appeared at the Canadian Women's Amateur, placing 38th at the 2018 edition and 21st at the 2019 event. In 2019, Ruffels became the first ever Australian to win the U.S. Women's Amateur. With her U.S Amateur win, Ruffels received an exemption to the 2020 U.S. Women's Open. Additional 2020 events Ruffels received exemptions for were the ANA Inspiration, Evian Championship and Women's British Open. The following year, Ruffels was runner-up at the 2020 U.S Women's Amateur.

Professional golf
In professional events, Ruffels was cut in the 2016 and 2017 Women's Victorian Open on the ALPG Tour. A few years later, Ruffels missed the cut in the 2019 U.S. Women's Open. In Japan, Ruffels also missed the cut at the Suntory Ladies Open and Japan Women's Open Golf Championship during 2019. During 2020, Ruffels had a 13th place tie at the 2020 U.S. Women's Open and a 15th place tie at the 2020 ANA Inspiration. Outside of the United States, Ruffels had a 13th place tie at the 2020 Women's British Open.

In 2021, Ruffels became a professional golfer upon her debut at the Gainbridge LPGA at Boca Rio. Throughout the year, Ruffels primarily played on the LPGA Tour while also competing on the Symetra Tour and Ladies European Tour. Her highest finishes that season were fourth place at the IOA Championship and a tie for 17th place at the Hugel-Air Premia LA Open. She also tied for 19th place during the 2021 ANA Inspiration and tied for 33rd place during the 2021 Women's PGA Championship.

Her first professional win came at he 2023 Carlisle Arizona Women's Golf Classic on the Epson Tour.

Amateur wins
2018 Windy City Collegiate Championship
2019 North and South Women's Amateur, U.S. Women's Amateur
2020 Rebel Beach Intercollegiate

Source:

Professional wins (1)

Epson Tour wins (1)
2023 Carlisle Arizona Women's Golf Classic

Results in LPGA majors

CUT = missed the half-way cut
NT = no tournament
T = tied

Team appearances
Arnold Palmer Cup (representing the International team): 2019 (winners), 2020 (winners)

References

External links

Australian female golfers
Australian people of Peruvian descent
USC Trojans women's golfers
Winners of ladies' major amateur golf championships
Australian female tennis players
Australian people of American descent
2000 births
Living people